Tranebjaerg-Svejgaard syndrome, also known as X-linked mental retardation associated with psoriasis is a very rare genetic disorder which is characterized by intellectual disabilities, psychomotor development delays, seizures, psoriasis, and cranio-facial dysmorphisms. It is a type of X-linked syndromic intellectual disability. Only 4 cases have been described in medical literature.

Presentation 

The following list comprises the symptoms this disorder causes in the people affected by it:

 Severe intellectual disability
 Psychomotor retardation
 Epilepsy
 Psoriasis
 Hypertelorism
 Broad nose
 Anteverted eyes
 Macrostomia
 High palate
 Large ears

History 

This condition was first discovered in June 1988, when Tranebjaerg et al. described four male cousins with seizures, severe intellectual disability, and psoriasis. They had normal levels of steroid sulfatase. Only two out of the four male cousins had survived. They (Tranebjaerg et al.) proposed this case to be part of a novel X-linked recessive intellectual disability syndrome. One of the sisters decided to terminate 3 consecutive pregnancies which were pre-natally detected to be male, leaving her with 3 consecutive terminations, after those events, she had a female pregnancy, which presumably wouldn't result in another affected baby.

References 

 Disorders causing seizures
Rare diseases
Syndromes with intellectual disability
Genetic diseases and disorders